David Bain (born 2 May 1966) is a retired Australian rules footballer who played for the Brisbane Bears and Fitzroy in the Australian Football League (AFL).
Bain started his career in the WAFL with East Perth Football Club playing 72 games with them from 1985 to 1988 and kicking 41 goals. He was their best and fairest winner in 1988 and also won that year's Sandover Medal.

In 1989 he left Western Australia and joined the Brisbane Bears. Bain was the joint winner of Brisbane's best and fairest in 1990 with Martin Leslie. He also finished equal fourth in the Brownlow Medal count. In 1994 he crossed to Fitzroy and spent a season with the club.

The third part of his career was spent in the QAFL where he had a successful stint as captain of the Southport Sharks, leading them to four premierships and winning two Grogan Medals.

External links 
 
 

1966 births
Australian rules footballers from Western Australia
Brisbane Bears players
East Perth Football Club players
Fitzroy Football Club players
Southport Australian Football Club players
Living people
People from Albany, Western Australia
Sandover Medal winners
Brisbane Bears Club Champion winners
Western Australian State of Origin players
Australia international rules football team players
Sport in Albany, Western Australia